The Roman Catholic Church of Saint Charles Borromeo is a Roman Catholic church on Ogle Street in the Diocese of Westminster, London.

Named after Charles Borromeo, a 16th-century Italian saint.

On the outside it is Gothic Revival style; the architect was Samuel Joseph Nicholl, possibly in partnership with T.J. Willson. The church was built in 1862/3 and cost £4,000; the land was gifted by an anonymous donor. The builders were Messrs Patman and Fotheringham. It was opened by Cardinal Wiseman on 20 May 1863.

John Francis Bentley added the present reredos, high altar and communion rails in 1870/73. The reredos, which is thirty feet high, has two tiers of saints painted on slate by Nathaniel Westlake. The frontal for the Lady Chapel altar was added in 1879.

The reredos, designed by Nicholl, in the Sacred Heart chapel was added in 1902, with four angels in niches are holding the instruments of the Passion; in the central niche is a statue of the Sacred Heart by Theodore Phyffers (1821-1876), a Belgian-born sculptor working in London.

When the lease expired the church survived because Madame Meschini and her son Arturo purchased the land and donated it the Westminster diocese. The church was consecrated on 4 September 1921. It fortunately survived being damaged in the war and the interior was restored in 1957/63 and again in 1978/80, when the reredos was restored and a large forward altar, by Michael Anderson, installed. The octagonal immersion font, designed by Michael Anderson in collaboration with Mattia del Prete and Antonio Incognito of Rome, was installed in the nave in 1984.

There are four stained glass windows in the south aisle of Saints Patrick, Margaret, Cecilia (1898) and Thomas of Canterbury.

References

External links 

http://catholicdirectory.org/Catholic_Information.asp?ID=38147

Roman Catholic churches in the City of Westminster
Grade II listed churches in the City of Westminster